Tariku Bekele Beyecha (Amharic: ታሪኩ በቀለ; born 28 February 1987) is an Ethiopian professional long-distance runner, who specializes in the 5000 metres and has moved up to 10000 metres as well. He is the younger brother of Kenenisa Bekele. He is the fourth fastest Ethiopian ever over 5000 m and 3000 metres. His indoor 3000 m best of 7:31.09 ranks him as the ninth fastest of all-time in the event. He was the 10,000 m bronze medallist at the 2012 Summer Olympics.

His first major victory came at the 2008 IAAF World Indoor Championships, where he won the 3000 m gold medal. He was the 2006 World Junior Champion over the distance and also won a cross country junior bronze medal that year. He took a continental silver medal at the 2007 All-Africa Games. Tariku has finished in the top eight of 5000 m finals at the 2008 Summer Olympics and at the World Championships in Athletics in 2005 and 2007.

Running career
Following the footsteps of his older brother, he first had success at the younger levels of the sport. He won the 3000 m silver medal behind Augustine Choge at the 2003 World Youth Championships in Athletics and stepped up a distance to take the bronze medal over 5000 m at the 2004 World Junior Championships a year later. He beat Paul Tergat in the 2004 Oeiras International Cross Country meeting.

He made his senior global debut at the 2005 World Championships in Athletics and finished in seventh place in the 5000 m, just ahead of his more experienced compatriot Dejene Berhanu. He ran the 3000 m at the 2006 IAAF World Indoor Championships, finishing in sixth place. Building upon his successes on the track, he was third in the junior race at the 2006 IAAF World Cross Country Championships (while his brother Kenenisa won both senior races).

Tariku became the 5000 m junior champion at the 2006 World Junior Championships and was fourth over the distance at the 2006 IAAF World Athletics Final. He took the 3000 m gold at the World Final, however, having also run the third fastest 3000 m time of the season (7:29.11) in a second-place performance behind Isaac Kiprono Songok at the Rieti Meeting.

His main focus of the 2007 season was on the 5000 m and he won the silver medal at the 2007 All-Africa Games before going on to take fifth place at the 2007 World Championships over the distance – the best performance by an Ethiopian at the competition. He ascended to the top of his event at the 2008 IAAF World Indoor Championships by winning the indoor 3000 m title at the age of 21 – succeeding his brother as the champion in the event. He made his Olympic debut at the 2008 Beijing Games and was sixth over 5000 m. Among other competitions, he competed at the 2008 IAAF World Athletics Final that year, also finishing in sixth.

He attempted to defend his world title at the 2010 IAAF World Indoor Championships, but it was not to be and he finished in fourth place as Bernard Lagat succeeded him as the 3000 m champion. In the inaugural 2010 IAAF Diamond League series he took two major wins at the Prefontaine Classic and the Weltklasse Zurich meets. He set a world-leading time in the 3000 m at the 2010 Rieti IAAF Grand Prix, running 7:28.70 to finish .30 seconds ahead of Bernard Lagat (who set an American record). The 2010 IAAF Continental Cup presented another opportunity as he was selected to represent Africa over 3000 m. Just as had happened indoors, he was fourth and out of the medals while Lagat took the honours. Tariku took to the roads at the end of the track season, competing at the 10-mile Dam tot Damloop race, but he could only manage sixth place with a time of 46:44. He then ran at the Memorial Peppe Greco and finished as runner-up, beaten to the line by a second by defending champion Edwin Soi.

In 2011 he competed on the 2011 IAAF Diamond League circuit, coming third over 5000 m at the Adidas Grand Prix and fourth over two miles at the Prefontaine Classic. His season's best run of 12:55.47 minutes came at the Herculis meeting in Monaco. He was selected as a back-up runner for the Ethiopian team at the 2011 World Championships, but did not compete. He ended the year with a win at the Saint Silvester Road Race, becoming only the second Ethiopian to win the race after Tesfaye Jifar.

He guaranteed his selection for the 2012 London Olympics with a 10,000 m win at the FBK Games in May 2012 and a personal best run of 27:03.24 minutes to finish second to his brother Kenenisa at the United Kingdom trials. At the Olympic 10,000 m final Tariku finished ahead of his brother to edge into the bronze medal spot and finish as Africa's top performer in the event – it was his first major outdoor medal on the global stage. After the Olympics he competed in a number of road races. He won the Giro di Castelbuono 10K, placed third at the Great South Run and recorded a time of 62:59 minutes in his half marathon debut in Lisbon. He again closed the year with a New Year race win, this time with a personal best run of 28:29 minutes at the San Silvestre Vallecana 10K.

Statistics

International competitions

Marathons

Personal bests

References

External links

IAAF: Focus on Athletes

1987 births
Living people
Ethiopian male middle-distance runners
Ethiopian male long-distance runners
Athletes (track and field) at the 2008 Summer Olympics
Athletes (track and field) at the 2012 Summer Olympics
Olympic athletes of Ethiopia
Sportspeople from Oromia Region
Olympic bronze medalists for Ethiopia
Medalists at the 2012 Summer Olympics
Olympic bronze medalists in athletics (track and field)
African Games bronze medalists for Ethiopia
African Games medalists in athletics (track and field)
Athletes (track and field) at the 2007 All-Africa Games
World Athletics Indoor Championships winners
21st-century Ethiopian people